The Procession of the Golden Tree or Pageant of the Golden Tree (in Dutch: Praalstoet van de Gouden Boom or Gouden Boomstoet) is a historical pageant held in the city of Bruges, Belgium, every five years to commemorate the celebration there in 1468 of the wedding of Charles the Bold and Margaret of York. It has been organised since 1958.

See also
Kattenstoet
Ommegang of Brussels
Procession of the Holy Blood

References

External links

 Website of the organising committee. Accessed 8 February 2015.

Historical reenactment events
Parades in Belgium
Tourist attractions in Bruges
Culture in Bruges
Summer events in Belgium